George N. Stonbely (born December 7, 1945) is an American advertising entrepreneur and civic leader known for his work and advocacy in New York's Times Square.

Born in 1945 in Park Slope, Brooklyn, New York, George N. Stonbely graduated from New York University in 1967. While still in college, he first volunteered then worked as a legislative researcher for Robert F. Kennedy, who was the United States Senator from New York at the time. Stonbely worked briefly in sales promotion and advertising for the New York Times, then in 1975, he founded Spectacolor, Inc., an advertising company that pioneered the first full-color, computer-programmed, changeable message billboard. This groundbreaking innovation introduced the concept of selling time on billboards, rather than the customary practice of selling space, a change that would pave the way for outdoor advertising to become a multibillion-dollar industry.

The first Spectacolor sign was installed at One Times Square, the building from which the world-famous Times Square Ball is dropped every New Year's Eve. Eventually more than 60 Spectacolor signs (including static signs, video displays, and 3D spectacular signs) were installed in Times Square, along with more than 50 Spectacolor systems in 30 cities in Europe, South America, the Middle East, and across the United States. In 1984, Spectacolor was chosen by the Marriott Corporation to develop the premiere signage on its new Marriott Marquis Hotel, the first of the developments that led to the rebirth of Times Square that began in the 1980s. The flagship sign, the Eastman Kodak Company's "Kodarama" display, signaled the return of corporate America to Times Square for the first time since the end of World War II. Soon Kodak was joined by Hertz, AT&T, JVC, Chock Full o' Nuts, Maxwell House Coffee Company, Planters Peanuts, and Wrigley, to name a few of the iconic brands that helped reestablish a mainstream marketing presence in Times Square.

By 2000, Spectacolor was the world leader in spectacular advertising, operating in over 30 cities around the globe. That year, Stonbely partnered with Arizona entrepreneur Karl Eller and Clear Channel Communications to form Clear Channel Spectacolor, which he sold to Clear Channel in 2006.

A long-time Times Square advocate, Stonbely is a founding director of the Times Square Alliance and serves on the Mayor's Midtown Citizens Committee. He is also active in numerous international and local charitable organizations, including UNICEF, Partnership for a Drug Free America, and the Greater New York Boy Scouts. He serves on the Board of Directors of Inside Broadway and The Town Hall.

Upon his death in 1999, legendary outdoor advertising designer Douglas Leigh willed Stonbely his famous lighted snowflake, which has been suspended above the intersection of Fifth Avenue and 57th Street in Manhattan every holiday season since 1984. In 2001, Stonbely dedicated the snowflake to UNICEF, for which more than $50 million has been raised since the UNICEF Snowflake Ball gala was launched in 2004.

References 

 https://www.nytimes.com/2000/01/30/realestate/streetscapes-george-stonbely-a-times-square-signmaker-who-loves-spectacle.html

1945 births
Living people
People from Park Slope
American advertising executives